The vice chairman of the Supreme People's Assembly is a member of the Supreme People's Assembly that ranks next to the chairman. The SPA vice chairman is elected by the Supreme People's Assembly along with the SPA chairman. From 1972 until 1998, the SPA vice chairman was concurrently the SPA Standing Committee vice chairman.

The current vice chairpersons of the Supreme People's Assembly are Pak Kum-hui, who was elected on 11 April 2019, and Maeng Kyong Il, who was elected on 17 January 2023.

List of office holders

References 

Supreme People's Assembly
Parliamentary titles